The Hannibal Cavemen were a collegiate summer league baseball team located in Hannibal, Missouri, in the United States. They were a member of the West Division of the summer collegiate Prospect League from 2009–2016. The franchise began playing again as the Hannibal Hoots, in 2018.

History
Built in 1938, Clemens Field had fallen into disrepair by the mid-2000s. Having last hosted professional baseball and the Hannibal Stags in 1955, the city debated whether Clemens Field was worth preserving. Soon afterwards, a group led by Roland Hemond (advisor to Arizona Diamondbacks president Derrick Hall) stepped forward with a plan to renovate Clemens Field and make it home to a 2009 team in the Central Illinois Collegiate League (CICL).

On June 10, 2008, ground was broken for Clemens Field's renovation. Almost two months later, on August 1, 2008, the Cavemen announced their name, which was a homage to the numerous caves in Hannibal which are popular with tourists.

On November 11, 2008, the CICL announced it was merging into the new Prospect League, which the Cavemen joined as a member of the West Division, beginning in the 2009 season.

On January 6, 2017, the Prospect League announced that the Hannibal franchise had elected to suspend operations for the 2017 season. The franchise began playing again as the Hannibal Hoots, starting with the 2018 season.

Overall Records by Year

References

External links

Prospect League teams
Marion County, Missouri
Ralls County, Missouri
Defunct baseball teams in Missouri
Baseball teams disestablished in 2016
Baseball teams established in 2009